Kotla Arab Ali Khan is a town in Pakistan. The town is located at 32°51'05N 74°04'20E and is situated near the border with Azad Kashmir and Punjab, Pakistan. Kotla Arab Ali Khan is the Union Council -99 of Tehsile Kharian located in the Gujrat District of Pakistan.

References

Union councils of Gujrat District